Matt Robinson (born 9 March 1990) is a New Zealand rugby league footballer who plays for the Burleigh Bears in the Intrust Super Cup. His choice of position is Second-Row.

Playing career
A Porirua Vikings junior, Robinson joined the New Zealand Warriors in 2009 and played 40 games for the Junior Warriors in the Toyota Cup between 2009 and 2010, scoring three tries. He played for the Auckland Vulcans in 2011 before leaving to join the Penrith Panthers.

Robinson made his National Rugby League debut for the Panthers in round 7 of the 2012 season, against the Wests Tigers. Robinson then spent two seasons with the Gold Coast Titans, where he played in six matches. In August 2016, the Limoux Grizzlies announced the signing of Robinson.

References

External links
Gold Coast Titans profile

1990 births
Living people
Auckland rugby league team players
New Zealand rugby league players
New Zealand Māori rugby league players
Penrith Panthers players
Gold Coast Titans players
Porirua Vikings players
Burleigh Bears players
Rugby league players from Wellington City
Rugby league second-rows
Tweed Heads Seagulls players
Limoux Grizzlies players
Windsor Wolves players